Louise Erixon (born 7 April 1989) is a Swedish media commentator and politician of the Sweden Democrats party who served as the Mayor of Sölvesborg between 2019 and 2022.

Biography
Erixon is the daughter of Örjan Erixon and former Riksdag member of parliament Inger Lindberg (also known as Margareta Gunsdotter). She has described herself as coming from a Christian family and that her parents would read her the Bible as a child.

She first joined the Sweden Democrats in 2006 and became the local leader for the Sweden Democratic Youth (SDU) in Gävleborg in 2007. In 2010, she was elected as a municipal councilor in Gävle. She also worked as an assistant to Sweden Democrats politician Björn Söder. Erixon is a member of the election committee for SD-Women, the women's branch of the party.

In November 2012, she directed criticism at the SDU for not sufficiently supporting the mother party and argued the youth wing should be reformed or disbanded after its leadership defended Erik Almqvist following the so-called iron pipe scandal in which Almqvist was recorded using sexist language.

During the 2018 Swedish local elections, Erixon was elected leader of the municipal board in Sölvesborg municipality along with Moderate Party representative Paul Andersson. In 2019, she was elected as mayor of Sölvesborg becoming one of the first SD politicians to be elected as a mayor.

Erixon has publicly commented on art and culture in Swedish media. As Mayor, she declared public art to be purchased for the municipality should be timeless and classic rather than contemporary art. Following this, Fokus magazine named Erixon as the most powerful cultural politician in the country.

From 2011 to 2020, Erixon was in a relationship with SD leader Jimmie Akesson by whom she has a son.

References 

Sweden Democrats politicians
Living people
1989 births
People from Sölvesborg Municipality
Mayors of places in Sweden
Swedish journalists